Hentai is anime and manga pornography.

Hentai may also refer to:

 "Hentai" (song), by Rosalía
 "Hentai", a song by Cigarettes After Sex from Cry
 "Hentai", a song by Pink Guy from Pink Season
 "Hentai", a song by S3RL

See also